The Vice-Admiral of Dorset  was responsible for the defence of the County of Dorset, England.

As a Vice-Admiral, the post holder was the chief of naval administration for his district. His responsibilities included pressing men for naval service, deciding the lawfulness of prizes (captured by privateers), dealing with salvage claims for wrecks and acting as a judge.

History
In 1863 the Registrar of the Admiralty Court stated that the offices had 'for many years been purely honorary' (HCA 50/24 pp. 235–6). Appointments were made by the Lord High Admiral when this officer existed. When the admiralty was in commission appointments were made by the crown by letters patent under the seal of the admiralty court.

Vice Admirals of Dorset
This is a list of people who have been Vice-Admiral of Dorset.
c.1526–1536: Giles Strangways
1551–1580: Lord Thomas Howard (Viscount Howard of Bindon from 1559)
1580–1582: Vacant
1582: Henry Ashley
1582–1591: Sir Christopher Hatton
1591–1603: Sir Carew Raleigh
1603–1611: Thomas Howard, 3rd Viscount Howard of Bindon
1611–1640: Theophilus Howard, 2nd Baron Howard de Walden (Earl of Suffolk from 1626)
1640–1642: Francis Cottington, 1st Baron Cottington
1642–1644: Vacant
1644–1653: John Arthur
1653–1660: Vacant
1661–1672: Bullen Reymes
1672–1679: Vacant
1679–1699: Anthony Ashley-Cooper, Lord Ashley (Earl of Shaftesbury from 1683)
1699–1702: Anthony Ashley-Cooper, 3rd Earl of Shaftesbury
1702–1713: Thomas Strangways
1713–1714: Vacant
1714–1742: George Trenchard
1742–1754: Charles Powlett, 3rd Duke of Bolton
1754–1755: Vacant
1755–1759: Harry Powlett, 4th Duke of Bolton
1759–1765: Charles Powlett, Marquess of Winchester (Duke of Bolton from later in 1759)
1765–1767: Vacant
1767–1794: Harry Powlett, 6th Duke of Bolton
1794–1797: Vacant
1797–1800: George Paulet, 12th Marquess of Winchester

References

External links
Institute of Historical Research

Military ranks of the United Kingdom
Vice-Admirals
Vice Admirals
D